Nototriton lignicola is a species of salamander in the family Plethodontidae. It is also known as the Cerro de Enmedio moss salamander.
It is endemic to Honduras.

Its natural habitat is subtropical or tropical moist montane forests.
It is threatened by habitat loss.

References

L
Endemic fauna of Honduras
Amphibians of Honduras
Critically endangered fauna of North America
Taxonomy articles created by Polbot
Amphibians described in 1997